In cryptography, the avalanche effect is the desirable property of cryptographic algorithms, typically block ciphers and cryptographic hash functions, wherein if an input is changed slightly (for example, flipping a single bit), the output changes significantly (e.g., half the output bits flip). In the case of high-quality block ciphers, such a small change in either the key or the plaintext should cause a drastic change in the ciphertext. The actual term was first used by Horst Feistel, although the concept dates back to at least Shannon's diffusion.

If a block cipher or cryptographic hash function does not exhibit the avalanche effect to a significant degree, then it has poor randomization, and thus a cryptanalyst can make predictions about the input, being given only the output. This may be sufficient to partially or completely break the algorithm. Thus, the avalanche effect is a desirable condition from the point of view of the designer of the cryptographic algorithm or device.

Constructing a cipher or hash to exhibit a substantial avalanche effect is one of the primary design objectives, and mathematically the construction takes advantage of the butterfly effect. This is why most block ciphers are product ciphers. It is also why hash functions have large data blocks. Both of these features allow small changes to propagate rapidly through iterations of the algorithm, such that every bit of the output should depend on every bit of the input before the algorithm terminates.

Strict avalanche criterion 
The strict avalanche criterion (SAC) is a formalization of the avalanche effect. It is satisfied if, whenever a single input bit is complemented, each of the output bits changes with a 50% probability. The SAC builds on the concepts of completeness and avalanche and was introduced by Webster and Tavares in 1985.

Higher-order generalizations of SAC involve multiple input bits.
Boolean functions which satisfy the highest order SAC are always bent functions,
also called maximally nonlinear functions,
also called "perfect nonlinear" functions.

Bit independence criterion 
The bit independence criterion (BIC) states that output bits j and k should change independently when any single input bit i is inverted, for all i, j and k.

See also 
 Butterfly effect
 Confusion and diffusion

References 

Symmetric-key cryptography